Dart was a manufacturer of commercial vehicles in Waterloo, Iowa, that was established around 1910.

History 
The company began with light commercial vehicles for farmers in Waterloo. Later Liberty trucks, tractors and vehicles for the oil industry were built. In WWII there were less successful attempts with heavy army trucks as the Truck Tractor T13. Later on the company merged with Paccar and built huge mining trucks for off-highway-use. The trademark is no longer in use.

See also

 Paccar
 Liberty truck
 Class 8 Trucks
 Dump truck
 Haul truck
 Semi-trailer truck

References 
 
 
 
 
 
 
 
 
 
 
 
 
 
 

Defunct motor vehicle manufacturers of the United States
Defunct truck manufacturers of the United States
Military trucks of the United States
Vehicle manufacturing companies established in 1910
World War I vehicles
Military vehicles introduced in the 1910s